Dylan Lauren (born May 9, 1974) is an American businesswoman. She is the daughter of American fashion designer Ralph Lauren, and the owner of New York City's Dylan's Candy Bar, which claims to be the "largest candy store in the world".

Early life and education
Dylan was born in New York City, the daughter of Ricky Ann Loew-Beer and Ralph Lauren. Her father was the son of  Belarusian-Jewish immigrants; her mother was the daughter of a Jewish father and a Catholic mother, both immigrants from Austria. Dylan is the youngest of three children, she has two older brothers: businessman David Lauren and filmmaker Andrew Lauren.

She attended the Dalton School in New York City and graduated from Duke University, where she studied art history. She was a member of Kappa Alpha Theta at Duke.

Career
Dylan founded Dylan's Candy Bar in 2001. She was inspired after seeing Willy Wonka & the Chocolate Factory on her sixth birthday. She was named one of the Top 25 Most Stylish New Yorkers by US Weekly in 2007. Her favorite designers include Ralph Lauren, Alice and Olivia, and 7 For All Mankind.

In 2010 Lauren released a book, “Dylan’s Candy Bar: Unwrap Your Sweet Life.” Source In December 2015, Dylan launched Dylan's Candy BarN, a granting foundation dedicated to supporting animal welfare organizations.

In 2017, Dylan began starring as a judge on the ABC reality series The Toy Box.

Personal life
Lauren and hedge fund manager Paul Arrouet married in June 2011. The ceremony was held in Bedford, New York, at the Lauren family estate, and she wore a bridal gown of her father's design. On April 13, 2015, Dylan's surrogate gave birth to fraternal twins, Cooper Blue and Kingsley Rainbow Arrouet.

References

External links
 
Dylan Lauren on Style.com - photos
Bio and photo of Dylan Lauren — Crain's New York Business 40 under 40 — 2008
An in depth interview with Dylan on Obsessed TV with Samantha Ettus

1974 births
Businesspeople in confectionery
American socialites
Duke University alumni
Living people
Lauren family
Businesspeople from New York City
American people of Belarusian-Jewish descent
American people of Austrian-Jewish descent
American people of Austrian descent
American women company founders
American food company founders